The siege of Constantinople of 860 was the only major military expedition of the Rus' Khaganate (Byzantine Greek: Ῥῶς) recorded in Byzantine and Western European sources. The casus belli was the construction of the fortress Sarkel by Byzantine engineers, restricting the Rus' trade route along the Don River in favor of the Khazars. Accounts vary, with discrepancies between contemporary and later sources, and the outcome is unknown in detail.

It is known from Byzantine sources that the Rus' caught Constantinople unprepared, while the empire was preoccupied by the ongoing Arab–Byzantine wars and was unable to respond effectively to the attack, certainly initially. After pillaging the suburbs of the Byzantine capital, the Rus' retreated for the day and continued their siege in the night after exhausting the Byzantine troops and causing disorganization. The event gave rise to a later Orthodox Christian tradition, which ascribed the deliverance of Constantinople to a miraculous intervention by the Theotokos.

Background
The first mention of the Rus' near the Byzantine Empire comes from Life of St. George of Amastris, a hagiographic work whose dating is debated. The Byzantines had come into contact with the Rus' in 839. The timing of the attack suggests the Rus' had been informed of the city's weakness, demonstrating that the lines of trade and communication did not cease to exist in the 840s and 850s. Nevertheless, the attack from the Rus' in 860 came as a surprise; it was as sudden and unexpected "as a swarm of wasps", as Photius put it. The empire was struggling to repel the Abbasid advance in Asia Minor. In March 860, the garrison of the key fortress Loulon unexpectedly surrendered to the Arabs. In April or May, both sides exchanged captives, and the hostilities briefly ceased; however, in the beginning of June, Emperor Michael III left Constantinople for Asia Minor to invade the Abbasid Caliphate.

Siege
On June 18, 860, at sunset, a fleet of about 200 Rus' vessels sailed into the Bosporus and started pillaging the suburbs of Constantinople (Old East Slavic: Tsarigrad, Old Norse: Miklagarðr). The attackers set homes on fire, drowning and stabbing the residents. Unable to do anything to repel the invaders, Patriarch Photius urged his flock to implore the Theotokos to save the city. Having devastated the suburbs, the Rus' passed into the Sea of Marmara and fell upon the Isles of the Princes, where the former Patriarch Ignatius of Constantinople was living in exile. The Rus' plundered the dwellings and the monasteries, slaughtering those they captured. They took twenty-two of the patriarch's servants aboard ship and dismembered them with axes.

The attack took the Byzantines by surprise, "like a thunderbolt from heaven", as it was put by Patriarch Photius in his famous oration written on the occasion. Emperor Michael III was absent from the city, as was his navy, which was dreaded for its skill in using Greek fire. The Imperial army, including troops normally garrisoned closest to the capital, was fighting the Arabs in Asia Minor. The city's land defences were weakened by this. The sea defences were also lacking as the Byzantine Navy was occupied fighting Arabs in the Aegean Sea and the Mediterranean Sea. These simultaneous deployments left the coasts and islands of the Black Sea, the Bosporus, and the Sea of Marmara susceptible to attack.

The invasion continued until August 4, when, in another of his sermons, Photius thanked heaven for miraculously relieving the city from such a dire threat. The writings of Photius provide the earliest example of the name "Rus" (Rhos) being mentioned in a Greek source; previously the dwellers of the lands to the north of the Black Sea were referred to archaically as "Tauroscythians". The patriarch reported that they had no supreme ruler and lived in some distant northern lands. Photius called them ἔθνος ἄγνωστον, "unknown people", although some historians prefer to translate the phrase as "obscure people", pointing out the earlier contacts between Byzantines and the Rus'.

Later traditions

The sermons of Photius offer no clue as to the outcome of the invasion or the reasons why the Rus' withdrew. Later sources attribute their retreat to the Emperor's speedy return. As the story goes, after Michael and Photius put the veil of the Theotokos into the sea, there arose a tempest which dispersed the boats of the barbarians. In later centuries, it was said that the Emperor hurried to the church at Blachernae and had the robe of the Theotokos carried in procession along the Theodosian Walls. This precious Byzantine relic was dipped symbolically into the sea and a great wind immediately arose and wrecked the Rus' ships. The pious legend was recorded by George Hamartolus, whose manuscript was an important source for the Primary Chronicle. The authors of the chronicle appended the names of Askold and Dir to the account as they believed that these two Varangians had presided over Kiev in 866. It was to this year that (through some quirk in chronology) they attributed the first Rus' expedition against the Byzantine capital.

Nestor's account of the first encounter between the Rus' and the Byzantines may have contributed to the popularity of the Theotokos in Russia. The miraculous saving of Constantinople from the barbarian hordes would appear in Russian icon-painting, without understanding that the hordes in question may have issued from Kiev. Furthermore, when the Blachernitissa was brought to Moscow in the 17th century, it was said that it was this icon that had saved Tsargrad from the troops of the "Scythian khagan", after Michael III had prayed before it to the Theotokos. Nobody noticed that the story had obvious parallels with the sequence of events described by Nestor.

In the 9th century, a legend sprang up to the effect that an ancient column at the Forum of Taurus had an inscription predicting that Constantinople would be conquered by the Rus. This legend, well known in Byzantine literature, was revived by the Slavophiles in the 19th century, when Russia was on the point of wresting the city from the Ottomans.

Criticism
As was demonstrated by Oleg Tvorogov and Constantine Zuckerman, among others, the 9th century and later sources are out of tune with the earliest records of the event. In his August sermon, Photius mentions neither Michael III's return to the capital nor the miracle with the veil (of which the author purportedly was a participant).

On the other hand, Pope Nicholas I, in a letter sent to Michael III on September 28, 865, mentions that the suburbs of the imperial capital were recently raided by the pagans who were allowed to retreat without any punishment. The Venetian Chronicle of John the Deacon reports that the Normanorum gentes, having devastated the suburbanum of Constantinople, returned to their own lands in triumph ("et sic praedicta gens cum triumpho ad propriam regressa est").

It appears that the victory of Michael III over the Rus' was invented by the Byzantine historians in the mid-9th century or later and became generally accepted in the Slavic chronicles influenced by them. However, the memory of the successful campaign was transmitted orally among the Kievans and may have dictated Nestor's account of Oleg's 907 campaign, which is not recorded in Byzantine sources at all.

Notes

References

Iohannes Diaconus. Chronicon. Rome: Monticolo, Cronache veneziane antichissime
Leo Grammaticus. Corpus Scriptorum Historiae Byzantinae. Bonn, 1842.
Logan, Donald F. The Vikings in History, 2nd ed. Routledge, 1992. 
Nicolai I. Papae epistolae. Ed. in: Monumenta Germaniae Hictorica. Epistolae VI. (Karolini eavi IV). Berlin, 1925
Symeon Logothetes. Chronicon. Bonn, 1838.
Theodose de Melitene. Chronographia. Munich, 1859.
Harris, Jonathan, Constantinople: Capital of Byzantium. Hambledon/Continuum, London, 2007.  
 Sverrir Jakobsson, The Varangians: In God’s Holy Fire (Palgrave Macmillan, 2020), pp. 23-34. 
Turnbull, Stephen. The Walls of Constantinople, AD 324–1453, Osprey Publishing, 
Tvorogov, Oleg. "Skol'ko raz khodili na Konstantinopol Askold i Dir?" Slavyanovedeniya, 1992. 2
Vasiliev, Alexander. The Russian Attack on Constantinople in 860. Cambridge Mass., 1925
Uspensky, Fyodor. The History of the Byzantine Empire, vol. 2. Moscow: Mysl, 1997
Zuckerman, Constantine. M. Kazanski, A. Nersessian & C. Zuckerman, Paris 2000, pp. 95–120.

External links
Opera Omnia of Leo Grammaticus by Migne Patrologia Graeca with analytical indexes
 Globetrotting Vikings: The Quest for Constantinople

860s conflicts
860
860s in the Byzantine Empire
9th century in the Byzantine Empire
9th century in Kievan Rus'
Battles involving the Vikings
860
860